Masafumi (written: 正文, 正史, 雅文, 雅史, 将史, 真史, 優文) is a masculine Japanese given name. Notable people with the name include:

, Japanese tenor singer
, Imperial Japanese Navy admiral
, Japanese musician
, Japanese footballer
, Japanese baseball player
 Masafumi Kawaguchi (born 1973), Japanese player of American football
, Japanese voice actor
, Japanese footballer
, Japanese archer
, Japanese footballer
, the founder of Square in 1983
, Japanese footballer
, Japanese baseball player
, Japanese ice hockey player
, Japanese volleyball player
, Japanese video game music composer
, Japanese baseball player
, Japanese footballer
, Japanese footballer

See also
Masabumi

Japanese masculine given names